Epikastea is a genus of beetles in the family Carabidae, containing the following species:

 Epikastea biolat Erwin, 2004
 Epikastea grace Erwin, 2004
 Epikastea limonae Liebke, 1936
 Epikastea mancocapac Erwin, 2004
 Epikastea piranha Erwin, 2004
 Epikastea poguei Erwin, 2004

References

Lebiinae